The 2016–17 Texas Longhorns women's basketball team represents the University of Texas at Austin in the 2016–17 NCAA Division I women's basketball season. It was head coach Karen Aston's fifth season at Texas. The Longhorns were members of the Big 12 Conference and play their home games at the Frank Erwin Center. They finished the season 25–9, 15–3 in Big 12 play to finish in second place. They advanced to the semifinals of the Big 12 women's basketball tournament where they lost to West Virginia. They received at-large bid of the NCAA women's basketball tournament where they defeated Central Arkansas and NC State in the first and second rounds before losing to Stanford in the sweet sixteen.

Roster

Rankings
2016–17 NCAA Division I women's basketball rankings

2016–17 media

Television and radio information
Most University of Texas home games were shown on the Longhorn Network, with national telecasts on the Big 12 Conference's television partners. On the radio, women's basketball games aired on KTXX-HD4 "105.3 The Bat", with select games on KTXX-FM 104.9.

Schedule

|-
!colspan=12 style="background:#CC5500; color:#FFFFFF;"| Exhibition

|-
!colspan=12 style="background:#CC5500; color:#FFFFFF;"| Regular season

|-
!colspan=12 style="background:#CC5500; color:#FFFFFF;"| Big 12 Women's Tournament

|-
!colspan=12 style="background:#CC5500; color:#FFFFFF;"| NCAA Women's Tournament

See also
 2016–17 Texas Longhorns men's basketball team

References

Texas Longhorns women's basketball seasons
Texas
Texas
Texas Longhorns
Texas Longhorns